Fungi is a plural form of fungus.

Fungi may also refer to:
 Fungi (music), a Caribbean music style
 Fúngi, a Central African food
 Cou-cou, also known as "fungi", a Caribbean food

See also
 Fungie, a dolphin in Dingle harbour, Ireland